Robert Barrett (born 28 July 1957) is a former Paralympic athlete from Great Britain competing mainly in running events.

Barrett, a below knee amputee, represented Great Britain in the 1988 Games in Seoul in athletics taking two bronze medals in the 100m and 200m Sprint (A4A9 class).

References

https://passingtheflame.uk/robbie-barrett/

https://www.paralympicheritage.org.uk/robert-barrett

Paralympic athletes of Great Britain
Athletes (track and field) at the 1988 Summer Paralympics
Athletes (track and field) at the 1992 Summer Paralympics
Paralympic bronze medalists for Great Britain
Living people
1957 births
Medalists at the 1988 Summer Paralympics
Paralympic medalists in athletics (track and field)
British male sprinters
Sprinters with limb difference
Paralympic sprinters
Sportspeople from Belfast